Crush is the debut collection of poetry by American poet Richard Siken. It was selected as the winner of the 2004 Yale Series of Younger Poets competition by Nobel laureate Louise Glück.

Themes 
The collection of poems contemplate infatuation, intimacy, loss, and grief. It is said that Siken's main inspiration was the death of his boyfriend in the early 1990s. 

The opening poem, Scheherazade (the title references to the character from One Thousand and One Nights) intimates inevitability and is foreboding in its tone. It positions the reader as an accomplice to its dealings. In Louise Glück's review of the poem, she makes the following observation, "Tell me, the poet says, the lie I need to feel safe, and tell me in your own voice, so I believe you. One more tale to stay alive."

Reception 
The Huffington Post's Victoria Chang praises the poet for writing with a "cinematic brilliance and urgency". 

In the foreword to Crush, competition judge Louise Glück wrote that the poems contained "cumulative, driving, apocalyptic power, [and] purgatorial recklessness", and that "Books of this kind dream big [...] They restore to poetry that sense of crucial moment and crucial utterance which may indeed be the great genius of the form."

Accolades 

 Yale Series of Younger Poets (winner)
 National Book Critics Circle Award (finalist)
 Lambda Literary Award (finalist) 
 Thom Gunn Award (finalist)

References

External links 

 Goodreads

American poetry collections
2004 poetry books